The 1931 Oklahoma Sooners football team represented the University of Oklahoma in the 1931 college football season. In their fifth year under head coach Adrian Lindsey, the Sooners compiled a 4–7–1 record (1–4 against conference opponents), finished in a tie for last place in the Big Six Conference, and were outscored by their opponents by a combined total of 108 to 88.

No Sooners received All-America honors in 1931, but guard Charles Teel received all-conference honors.

Schedule

References

Oklahoma
Oklahoma Sooners football seasons
Oklahoma Sooners football